This is a list of crime films released in 2009.

References

2000s
2009-related lists